The Seventh-day Adventist Church in Sweden is a small Christian denomination in Sweden with a reported 2,902 members as of June 30, 2020. The first Seventh-day Adventist Church congregation in Sweden was established in 1880 in Grythyttan.

In the early 2000s (decade), about 40 Swedish Seventh-day Adventist congregations existed in Sweden, most of them in central Sweden.

See also
Australian Union Conference of Seventh-day Adventists
Seventh-day Adventist Church in Brazil 
Seventh-day Adventist Church in Canada 
Seventh-day Adventist Church in the People's Republic of China
Seventh-day Adventist Church in Colombia 
Seventh-day Adventist Church in Cuba
Seventh-day Adventist Church in India
Italian Union of Seventh-day Adventist Churches 
Seventh-day Adventist Church in Ghana 
New Zealand Pacific Union Conference of Seventh-day Adventists
Seventh-day Adventist Church in Nigeria 
Adventism in Norway
Romanian Union Conference of Seventh-day Adventists
Seventh-day Adventist Church in Thailand 
Seventh-day Adventist Church in Tonga
Seventh-day Adventists in Turks and Caicos Islands

References

External links
Official website 

1880 establishments in Sweden
Christian denominations in Europe
Christian denominations in Sweden
Christianity in Stockholm
History of the Seventh-day Adventist Church
Religious organizations established in 1880
Sweden
Seventh-day Adventist Church in Europe